Reinaldo Arenas (July 16, 1943 – December 7, 1990) was a Cuban poet, novelist, and playwright known as a vocal critic of Fidel Castro, the Cuban Revolution, and the Cuban government. His memoir of the Cuban dissident movement and of being a political prisoner, Before Night Falls, was dictated after his escape to the United States during the 1980 Mariel boatlift and published posthumously, after Arenas, who was dying of AIDS, committed suicide with an overdose of pills.

Life 
Arenas was born in the countryside of Newport Beach, Aguas Claras, Holguín Province, Cuba, and later moved to the city of Holguín as a teenager. He was six years old when he started school, attending Rural School 91 in Perronales County. At that school, his interest in boys flourished. He writes about his sexual exploration with himself and the people around him, even detailing that most of his sexual activity was with animals. He talks openly of how the first times he had straight sex, while incomplete, was with his cousin, Dulce Maria. He also shares that his first act of gay sex was with his cousin Orlando when he was aged eight and his cousin was 12. He says, "In the country, sexual energy generally overcomes all prejudice, repression, and punishment… Physical desire overpowers whatever feelings of machismo our fathers take upon themselves to instill in us."

After moving to Holguín when he was a teen, Arenas got a job at a guava paste factory. When conditions in the city started to get worse, around 1958, he decided that he wanted to join the guerillas (Castro and his movement), by then he was 14. He walked to Velasco where he met Cuco Sánchez who took him to the Pro-Soviet Cuban guerrilla headquarters in the Sierra Gibara. A guerilla Commandante, Eddy Suñol, interviewed Arenas and then said, "We have plenty of guerrillas; what we need is weapons." After ten days with them, he went back to Holguín with the intention of killing a guard and taking his weapon. When he made it back to the city, he went home to see his grandparents who were not so happy to see him. Because he made the mistake of leaving a note saying he was going to join the guerillas, the women that lived with his grandparents spread the news like wildfire. Fulgencio Batista's secret police, the Bureau for the Repression of Communist Activities, were on the lookout for him. His brief trip home made him realize he could not stay, so he trekked back to Velasco to the rebel encampment. They had to accept him at that point.

When he was 16, he was awarded a scholarship at La Pantoja, the Batista military camp that had been converted into a polytechnic institute. At the school, one of the most important courses was on Marxist–Leninism. Students had to master the Manual of the USSR Academy of Sciences; Manual of Political Economy by Nikitin; Foundations of Socialism in Cuba by Blas Roca. Arenas graduated as an agricultural accountant, but later described his schooling as "communist indoctrination".

The first time Arenas was in Havana was in 1960. He returned later when he enrolled in a planning course at the University of Havana and reported to the Hotel Nacional de Cuba. While in the program, he worked for INRA, the National Institute for Agrarian Reform. It was not until around 1963 that Arenas started to live his life as a gay man, but even then, it was still a life in extreme secrecy. He feared ending up in one of the Military Units to Aid Production, which were concentration camps for LGBT people, Christians, and suspected members of the Cuban dissident movement. A relationship with a man named Miguel, who was later arrested and taken to a UMAP, was the beginning of Arenas' life of being known as a gay man by the Cuban Committees for the Defense of the Revolution.

Throughout his life, Arenas became friends with and had relationships with many gay men. Even going so far to say that at one point, he had had sex with at least 5,000 men. He watched as various friends and acquaintances pledged their allegiance to the regime in exchange for safety. They became informers for the government and reported other men, oftentimes friends and/or people they had relationships with in the past. The intention was to find gay and bisexual men and either prosecute and jail them or turn them into informers too. The reward for cooperating with the regime was your life. In order to become an informer, though, it often meant participating in Acts of repudiation denouncing their anti-regime beliefs or their homosexuality publicly – a very humiliating act.

Arenas watched this happen with Herberto Padilla. He had written a book that was critical of the Cuban Revolution to an official competition. Padilla was arrested in 1971 and after 30 days in a cell, he decided to speak. Various Cuban intellectuals were invited by State Security to hear what he had to say. Padilla stood in front of everyone and apologized for everything he had done. He painted himself as a coward and a traitor, apologizing for his previous work and throwing blame on himself. He publicly denounced his friends and his wife, saying they had counterrevolutionary attitudes. Those he named were forced to go to the microphone and accept blame for their actions and say that they were traitors too. 

In 1963, he moved to Havana to enroll in the School of Planification and, later, in the Faculty of Letters at the Universidad de La Habana, where he studied philosophy and literature without completing a degree. The following year, he began working at the Biblioteca Nacional José Martí. During his time working for INRA, he spent a lot of time at the National Library. After writing a short story and presenting it to a committee, he received a telegram that they were interested in talking to him. When he went, he met María Teresa Freye de Andrade, who was the director of the National Library. She orchestrated Arenas’ move from INRA to the Library. From then on, he was employed there. After María Teresa lost her job and was replaced by Castro's police, Captain Sidroc Ramos, Arenas decided the Library was not where he wanted to be. It was about this time that his talent was noticed, and he received a literary award for his novel, Singing from the Well, at Cirilo Villaverde National Competition held by UNEAC (National Union of Cuban Writers and Artists).

His El mundo alucinante (This Hallucinatory World, published in the U.S. as The Ill-Fated Peregrinations of Fray Servando) was awarded "first Honorable Mention" in 1966. Although, as the judges could find no better entry and they refused to award it to Arenas, no First Prize was awarded that year. His writings and openly gay life were, by 1967, bringing him into conflict with the communist government. He left the Biblioteca Nacional and became an editor for the Cuban Book Institute until 1968. From 1968 to 1974, he was a journalist and editor for the literary magazine La Gaceta de Cuba.

In 1974, he was sent to prison after being charged and convicted of "ideological deviation" and for publishing abroad without official consent. He escaped from prison and tried to leave Cuba by launching himself from the shore on a tire inner tube. The attempt failed and he was rearrested near Lenin Park and imprisoned at the notorious El Morro Castle alongside murderers and rapists. He survived by helping the inmates to write letters to wives and lovers. He was able to collect enough paper this way to continue his writing. However, his attempts to smuggle his work out of prison were discovered and he was severely punished. Threatened with death, he was forced to renounce his work and was released in 1976.
In 1980, as part of the Mariel Boatlift, he fled to the United States. He came on the boat San Lázaro captained by Cuban émigré Roberto Agüero.

Death 
In 1987, Arenas was diagnosed with AIDS; he continued to write and speak out against the Cuban government. He mentored many Cuban exile writers, including John O'Donnell-Rosales. After battling AIDS, Arenas died of an intentional overdose of drugs and alcohol on December 7, 1990, in New York City. In a suicide letter written for publication, Arenas wrote: Due to my delicate state of health and to the terrible depression that causes me not to be able to continue writing and struggling for the freedom of Cuba, I am ending my life ... I want to encourage the Cuban people abroad as well as on the Island to continue fighting for freedom. ... Cuba will be free. I already am. In 2012, Arenas was inducted into the Legacy Walk, an outdoor public display which celebrates LGBT history and people.

Writings 
Despite his short life and the hardships imposed during his imprisonment, Arenas produced a significant body of work. In addition to significant poetic efforts ("El Central", "Leprosorio"), his Pentagonia is  a set of five novels that comprise a "secret history" of post-revolutionary Cuba. It includes Singing from the Well (in Spanish also titled "Celestino before Dawn"), Farewell to the Sea (whose literal translation is "The Sea Once More"), Palace of the White Skunks, the Rabelaisian Color of Summer, and The Assault. In these novels Arenas’ style ranges from a stark realist narrative and high modernist experimental prose to absurd, satiric humor.  His second novel, Hallucinations ("El Mundo Alucinante"), rewrites the story of the colonial dissident priest Fray Servando Teresa de Mier.

In interviews, his autobiography, and in some of his fiction work itself, Arenas draws explicit connections between his own life experience and the identities and fates of his protagonists.  As is evident and as critics such as Francisco Soto have pointed out, the "child narrator" in "Celestino", Fortunato of "The Palace...", Hector of "Farewell..", and the triply named "Gabriel/Reinaldo/Gloomy Skunk" character in "Color" appear to live progressive stages of a continuous life story that is also linked to Arenas's own.  In turn, Arenas consistently links his individual narrated life to the historical experience of a generation of Cubans. A constant theme in his novels and other writing is the condemnation of the Castro government, although Arenas also critiques the Catholic Church, US culture and politics. He also critiques a series of literary personalities in Havana and internationally, particularly those who he believed had betrayed him and suppressed his work (Severo Sarduy and Ángel Rama are notable examples). His "Thirty truculent tongue-twisters", which he claims circulated in Havana and which are reprinted in "The Color of Summer", mock everyone from personal friends who he suggests may have spied on him to figures such as Nicolás Guillén, Alejo Carpentier, Miguel Barnet, Sarduy and of course Castro himself.

His autobiography, Before Night Falls was on the New York Times list of the ten best books of the year in 1993. In 2000 this work was made into a film, directed by Julian Schnabel, in which Arenas was played by Javier Bardem. An opera based on the autobiography with libretto and music by Cuban-American composer Jorge Martín premiered at the Fort Worth Opera on May 29, 2010, with baritone Wes Mason singing the role of Arenas.

The Reinaldo Arenas Papers are held at Princeton University Library. "The collection consists of personal and working papers of Reinaldo Arenas" and includes typescript and typescript drafts, essays, interviews, newspaper clippings, correspondence and other documents.

Notable works 
 El mundo alucinante (1966) , ; Scholarly edition by Enrico Mario Santí; English translation Hallucinations (2001 reissue) .
 Cantando en el pozo (1982) (originally published as Celestino antes del alba (1967)) English translation  Singing from the Well  (1987) .
 El palacio de las blanquisimas mofetas  (1982) English translation  The Palace of the White Skunks (1990) .
 Otra vez el mar (1982) English translation  Farewell to the Sea (1987) .
 El color del verano  (1982) English translation  The Color of Summer (1990) .
 El Asalto (1990) English translation  The Assault (1992) .
 El portero (1987) English translation  The Doorman (1991) .
 Antes que anochezca (1992) English translation  Before Night Falls (1993) .
 Mona and Other Tales (2001)  This is an English translation of a collection of short stories originally published in Spanish in Spain between 1995 and 2001
 Con los ojos cerrados (1972).
 La vieja Rosa (1980), English Translation Old Rosa (1989) .
 El central (1981), .
 Termina el desfile (1981).
 Arturo, la estrella más brillante (1984).
 Cinco obras de teatro bajo el título Persecución (1986).
 Necesidad de libertad (1986).
 La Loma del Angel (1987), English Translation Graveyard of the Angels (1987) .
 Voluntad de vivir manifestándose (1989) .
 Viaje a La Habana (1990).  .
 Final de un cuento (El Fantasma de la glorieta) (1991) .
 Adiós a mamá (1996)

See also

 American literature in Spanish
 Cuban American literature
 Cuban dissident movement
 List of Famous Cuban-Americans
 List of Cuban American writers
 LGBT rights in Cuba

References

Further reading 
English
 Reinaldo Arenas (Twayne's World Author Series) / Francisco Soto, 1998
 Reinaldo Arenas: The Pentagonía / Francisco Soto. Gainesville: University Press of Florida, 1994
 The postmodern poetic narrative of Cuban writer Reinaldo Arenas / Ileana C Zéndegui, 2004
 The manufacture of an author: Reinaldo Arenas's literary world, his readers and other contemporaries / Claudio Canaparo, 2000
 Reinaldo Arenas: tradition and singularity / Francisco Soto, 1988
 Reinaldo Arenas: the agony is the ecstasy / Dinora Caridad Cardoso, 1997
 Cosmopolitanisms and Latin America: Against the Destiny of Place / Jacqueline Loss. NY: Palgrave MacMillan, 2005 [A detailed study of Reinaldo Arenas and Diamela Eltit's cosmopolitan aspects]
 "Lifewriting with a Vengeance: Truth, Subalternity and Autobiographical Determination in Reinaldo Arenas's Antes que anochezca,"  By: Sandro R. Barros, Caribe: Revista de Cultura y Literatura, 2006 Summer; 9 (1): 41-56.
 "A Postmodern 'Play' on a Nineteenth-Century Cuban Classic: Reinaldo Arenas's La Loma del Angel,"  By: H. J. Manzari, Decimonónica: Journal of Nineteenth Century Hispanic Cultural Production, 2006 Summer; 3 (2): 45–58.
 "The Molecular Poetics of Before Night Falls," By: Teresa Rizzo, Rhizomes: Cultural Studies in Emerging Knowledge, 2006 Spring; 11–12.
 "Queer Parody and Intertextuality: A Postmodern Reading of Reinaldo Arenas's El cometa Halley,"  By: Francisco Soto, IN: Ingenschay, Desde aceras opuestas: Literatura/cultura gay y lesbiana en Latinoamérica. Madrid, Spain; Frankfurt, Germany: Iberoamericana; Vervuert; 2006. pp. 245–53
 "Revisiting the Circuitous Odyssey of the Baroque Picaresque Novel: Reinaldo Arenas's El mundo alucinante,"  By: Angela L. Willis, Comparative Literature, 2005 Winter; 57 (1): 61–83.
 "The Traumas of Unbelonging: Reinaldo Arenas's Recuperations of Cuba,"  By: Laurie Vickroy, MELUS: The Journal of the Society for the Study of the Multi-Ethnic Literature of the United States, 2005 Winter; 30 (4): 109–28.
 "Difficult Writings: AIDS and the Activist Aesthetic in Reinaldo Arenas' Before Night Falls,"  By: Diana Davidson, Atenea, 2003 December; 23 (2): 53–71.

Spanish
 Reinaldo Arenas : una apreciación política / Adolfo Cacheiro, 2000
 Reinaldo Arenas : recuerdo y presencia / Reinaldo Sánchez, 1994
 La escritura de la memoria : Reinaldo Arenas, textos, estudios y documentación / Ottmar Ette, 1992
 Reinaldo Arenas : narrativa de transgresión / Perla Rozencvaig, 1986
 La alucinación y los recursos literarios en las novelas de Reinaldo Arenas / Félix Lugo Nazario, 1995
 El círculo del exilio y la enajenación en la obra de Reinaldo Arenas / María Luisa Negrín, 2000
 La textualidad de Reinaldo Arenas : juegos de la escritura posmoderna / Eduardo C Bejar, 1987
 Reinaldo Arenas : alucinaciones, fantasía y realidad / Julio E Hernández-Miyares, 1990
 El desamparado humor de Reinaldo Arenas / Roberto Valero, 1991
 Ideología y subversión : otra vez Arenas / Reinaldo Sánchez, 1999

External links 
Reinaldo Arenas recorded at the Library of Congress for the Hispanic Division's audio literary archive on December 7, 1980
Aurelio Cortés collection of Reinaldo Arenas at Princeton University Library Special Collections
Dolores Koch collection of Reinaldo Arenas at Princeton University Library Special Collections

1943 births
1990 deaths
1990 suicides
20th-century American novelists
20th-century American male writers
20th-century American dramatists and playwrights
20th-century American poets
20th-century Cuban novelists
20th-century Cuban poets
20th-century Cuban LGBT people
American gay writers
American LGBT novelists
American LGBT poets
American LGBT dramatists and playwrights
American male novelists
American male poets
American male dramatists and playwrights
American Spanish-language poets
American writers of Cuban descent
Cuban dissidents
Cuban dramatists and playwrights
Cuban male novelists
Cuban male poets
Cuban refugees
Gay poets
Gay novelists
Gay dramatists and playwrights
Drug-related deaths in New York City
Drug-related suicides in New York City
Exiles of the Cuban Revolution in the United States
Hispanic and Latino American dramatists and playwrights
Hispanic and Latino American novelists
LGBT Hispanic and Latino American people
Cuban gay writers
Cuban LGBT novelists
Cuban LGBT poets
Cuban LGBT dramatists and playwrights
Opposition to Fidel Castro
People prosecuted under anti-homosexuality laws
People with HIV/AIDS
Suicides in New York City